Julio Agustin is a Broadway performer and Broadway Legacy Robe winner. He performed in the original Broadway companies of Fosse, Women on the Verge of a Nervous Breakdown with actress Patti LuPone, Steel Pier, Never Gonna Dance,  the revival of Bells Are Ringing, and was featured opposite Bebe Neuwirth in Chicago (musical). He appeared in the movies Center Stage and The Producers. In addition to his extensive work as a Broadway performer, he is a working director/choreographer, and was most nominated for an Audelco Award for his work as the director for the New Haarlem Arts Theatre’s Latina-inspired production of Sweet Charity.

Agustin created his own business, Agustin Consulting and Theatrical Services, LLC, where he works as an acting coach from his studio The Transition Workshop. Agustin recently released his first book, The Professional Actor's Handbook:  From Casting Call to Curtain Call.

Early life
Julio Agustin was born in The Bronx to Puerto Rican parents. Agustin began playing the piano for his high school choir. It is through his accompaniment work that Agustin discovered his passion for musical theatre.

Career
After graduating from Florida State University with a BM in Music Theatre, Julio Agustin began his professional career as a swing in the national tour of Kiss of the Spider Woman from 1994-1996, where he worked with Chita Rivera. He booked his first Broadway show shortly afterwards. In 1997, he performed as a swing for the Original Broadway Cast of Steel Pier at the Richard Rodgers Theatre.

A few years later, Agustin performed as a company member for the Original Broadway Cast of Fosse at the Broadhurst Theatre. Agustin would work on this show from 1999-2001 with names such as Elizabeth Parkinson and Scott Wise. Nearly immediately after working in Chicago, Agustin jumped straight into performing in the Original Broadway Cast of Bells Are Ringing at the Gerald Schoenfeld Theatre (at the time known as the Plymouth Theatre) in 2001 with Faith Prince on this production.

Agustin returned to school to earn his MFA in acting from Columbia University where he studied from 2001-2002. He then took a break to return to the professional world. In 2003, Agustin traveled to Maine's Ogunquit Playhouse to perform in Evita. He would play Che opposite to Felicia Finley. Agustin performed as Rome Tome in the 2003 Original Broadway Cast of Never Gonna Dance at the Broadhurst Theatre. He worked with Nancy Lemenager and Noah Racey on this production.

After transitioning from school to the professional world and back, Agustin graduated from Pennsylvania State with his MFA in Directing in 2007. Agustin began his professional career in directing and choreographing. In 2007, he was the director/choreographer of Pennsylvania Center Stage's Out of Line.

Julio Agustin again returned to Broadway's Chicago from 2007-2008 to play Fred Casely at the Shubert Theatre. He worked with Bebe Neuwirth and Bianca Marroquín during his second round in the production.

In 2008, Agustin traveled to the North Carolina Theatre to direct/choreograph Whistle Down the Wind. From 2010-2011, Agustin returned to Broadway to play Ambite in the Original Broadway cast of Women on the Verge of a Nervous Breakdown at the Belasco Theatre. He would work with Patti LuPone and Sherie Rene Scott and win a Broadway Legacy Robe for this show.

In 2012, Agustin would direct Sweet Charity at The New Haarlem Arts Theatre. This show would go on to win an Audelco Award for best choreography by Lanie Munro.

In the summer of 2016, Julio choreographed In the Heights at the Hangar Theatre and again at the Geva Theatre in Rochester, NY.

Julio Agustin recently released his first book, The Professional Actor's Handbook:  From Casting Call to Curtain Call in the spring of 2017.

Theater Credits

Broadway

Tours / Regional

Directing/Choreography

Filmography

Film

Awards and nominations

References

 "Gypsy Robe." Actors Equity. http://actorsequity.org/NewsMedia/news2010/nov9.GypsyWomenVerge.asp.
 "Julio Agustin Matos." Theatre Credits. http://www.broadwayworld.com/people/Julio-Agustin/. 18 Sept. 2016.
 League, The Broadway. "IBDB.com." Julio Agustin – Broadway Cast & Staff. https://www.ibdb.com/broadway-cast-staff/julio-agustin-29433. 18 Sept. 2016.
 
 @playbill. "Julio Agustin | Playbill." Playbill. http://www.playbill.com/person/julio-agustin-vault-0000088244. 18 Sept. 2016.
 
 Theater, Lincoln Center. "Julio Agustin | Lincoln Center Theater." Lincoln Center Theater. http://www.lct.org/shows/people/julio-agustin/. 18 Sept. 2016.
 
 Webster, Andy. "If This Dancer’s Amigas Could See Her Now." Nytimes. New York Times, https://www.nytimes.com/2012/08/06/theater/reviews/sweet-charity-at-new-haarlem-arts-theater.html.

External links
 http://www.julioagustin.com/
 https://www.ibdb.com/broadway-cast-staff/julio-agustin-29433
 http://www.playbill.com/person/julio-agustin-vault-0000088244
 https://www.imdb.com/name/nm0041908/

Living people
American male musical theatre actors
Columbia University School of the Arts alumni
Florida State University College of Fine Arts alumni
Penn State College of Arts and Architecture alumni
Year of birth missing (living people)